Qiezihe District is a district of the city of Qitaihe, Heilongjiang province, China, occupying the eastern quarter of the prefectural administration.

Administrative divisions 
Qiezihe District is divided into 13 subdistricts, 2 towns and 2 townships. 
13 subdistricts
 Dongfeng Shequgonggongfuwuzhan, Kangfu Shequgonggongfuwuzhan, Hudong Shequgonggongfuwuzhan, * Kangle Shequgonggongfuwuzhan, Yongtai Shequgonggongfuwuzhan, Tongda Shequgonggongfuwuzhan, Huimin Shequgonggongfuwuzhan, Anmin Shequgonggongfuwuzhan, Shengxin Shequgonggongfuwuzhan, Xinyuan Shequgonggongfuwuzhan, Dongsheng Shequgonggongfuwuzhan, Fuqiang Shequgonggongfuwuzhan and Longhu Shequgonggongfuwuzhan()
2 towns
 Qiezihe and Hongwei
2 townships
 Tieshan and Zhongxinhe

References

Qiezihe